San Marino is a residential city in Los Angeles County, California, United States.  It was incorporated on April 25, 1913. At the 2010 census the population was 13,147. The city is one of the wealthiest places in the nation in terms of household income. By extension, with a median home price of $2,699,098, San Marino is one of the most expensive and exclusive neighborhoods in the Los Angeles area.

History

Origin of name
The city takes its name from the ancient Republic of San Marino, founded by Saint Marinus who fled his home in Dalmatia (modern Croatia) at the time of the Diocletianic Persecution of Christians. Marinus took refuge at Monte Titano on the Italian peninsula, where he built a chapel and founded a monastic community in 301 A.D.  The state which grew from the monastery is the world's oldest surviving republic.

The seal of the City of San Marino, California is modeled on that of the republic, depicting the Three Towers of San Marino each capped with a bronze plume, surrounded by a heart-shaped scroll with two roundels and a lozenge (of unknown significance) at the top. The crown representing sovereignty on the original was replaced with five stars, representing the five members of the city's governing body. Beneath the city's seal are crossed palm fronds and orange branches. Other than the city's use of the name and copy of the Republic of San Marino seal, there is absolutely no historical connection between them.

The city celebrated its centennial in 2013, including publication by the San Marino Historical Society of a 268-page book, San Marino, A Centennial History, by Elizabeth Pomeroy. In September 2014, this book and author Elizabeth Pomeroy received a prestigious Award of Merit for Leadership in History from the American Association for State and Local History (AASLH).

Early history
The site of San Marino was originally occupied by a village of Tongva (Gabrieleño) Indians located approximately where the Huntington School is today. The area was part of the lands of the San Gabriel Mission. Principal portions of San Marino were included in an 1838 Mexican land grant of 128 acres to Victoria Bartolmea Reid, a Gabrieleña Indian.  (After her first husband, also a Gabrieleño, died in 1836 of smallpox, she remarried Scotsman Hugo Reid in 1837).  She called the property Rancho Huerta de Cuati.  After Hugo Reid's death in 1852, Señora Reid sold her rancho in 1854 to Don Benito Wilson, the first Anglo owner of Rancho San Pascual.  In 1873, Don Benito conveyed to his son-in-law, James DeBarth Shorb, including Rancho Huerta de Cuati, which Shorb named "San Marino" after his grandfather's plantation in Maryland, which, in turn, was named after the Republic of San Marino located on the Italian Peninsula in Europe.

History (1900s) 
In 1903, the Shorb rancho was purchased by Henry E. Huntington (1850–1927), who built a large mansion on the property. The site of the Shorb/Huntington rancho is occupied today by the Huntington Library, which houses a world-renowned art collection, research and rare-book library, and botanical gardens. In 1913 the three primary ranchos of Wilson, Patton, and Huntington, together with the subdivided areas from those and smaller ranchos, such as the Stoneman, White, and Rose ranchos, were incorporated as the city of San Marino.

The first mayor of the city of San Marino was George Smith Patton (1856-1927), the son of a slain Confederate States of America colonel in the U.S. Civil War (also named George Smith Patton, 1833–1864). He married Ruth Wilson, the daughter of Don Benito Wilson. Their son was the World War II general George S. Patton Jr.

To a prior generation of Southern Californians, San Marino was known for its old-money wealth and as a bastion of the region's WASP gentry. By mid-century, however, other European ethnic groups had become the majority. 
In 1970, the city was 99.7% White.

By 1990, the city's households were 23.7% Asian.
In 2000, the city's Asian households increased to 40%.
In recent decades, immigrants of Chinese and Taiwanese ancestry have come to represent more than 60% of the population, perhaps due to its location in the San Gabriel Valley, known to be a popular destination for East Asian immigrants.

Geography
The city is located in the San Rafael Hills, and is divided into seven zones, based on minimum lot size. Because of this and other factors, most of the homes in San Marino, built between 1920 and 1950, do not resemble the houses in surrounding Southern California neighborhoods (with the exception, perhaps, of neighboring portions of Pasadena). San Marino has also fostered a sense of historic preservation among its homeowners. With minor exceptions, the city's strict design review and zoning laws have thus far prevented the development of large homes found elsewhere in Los Angeles.

San Marino is highly restrictive of commercial operations in the city. It is one of the few cities that requires commercial vehicles to have permits to work within the city. The rationale is that commercial vehicle operators and service providers, such as gardeners, pool service providers and maintenance workers, are more likely to cause social disruption within the city, and so must be preauthorized for crime control and prosecutorial purposes. This regulation and others, including the bans on apartment buildings, townhouses and overnight parking, are some of the more obvious examples.

Demographics

2010
The 2010 United States Census reported that San Marino had a population of 13,147. The racial makeup of San Marino was 5,434 (41.3%) White (37.1% Non-Hispanic White), 55 (0.4%) African American, 5 (0.0%) Native American, 7,039 (53.5%) Asian, 2 (0.0%) Pacific Islander, 198 (1.5%) from other races, and 414 (3.1%) from two or more races. Hispanic or Latino of any race were 855 persons (6.5%).

The census reported that 13,066 people (99.4% of the population) lived in households, 81 (0.6%) lived in non-institutionalized group quarters, and 0 (0%) were institutionalized.

There were 4,330 households, out of which 1,818 (42.0%) had children under the age of 18 living in them, 3,220 (74.4%) were opposite-sex married couples living together, 367 (8.5%) had a female householder with no husband present, 143 (3.3%) had a male householder with no wife present.  There were 42 (1.0%) unmarried opposite-sex partnerships, and 22 (0.5%) same-sex married couples or partnerships. Of all households, 531 (12.3%) were made up of individuals, and 359 (8.3%) had someone living alone who was 65 years of age or older. The average household size was 3.02.  There were 3,730 families (86.1% of all households); the average family size was 3.28.

The population was spread out, with 3,422 people (26.0%) under the age of 18, 712 people (5.4%) aged 18 to 24, 2,353 people (17.9%) aged 25 to 44, 4,351 people (33.1%) aged 45 to 64, and 2,309 people (17.6%) who were 65 years of age or older.  The median age was 45.3 years. For every 100 females, there were 92.4 males.  For every 100 females age 18 and over, there were 87.7 males.

The homeowner vacancy rate was 0.5%; the rental vacancy rate was 6.5%; 11,834 people (90.0% of the population) lived in owner-occupied housing units and 1,232 people (9.4%) lived in rental housing units.

According to the 2010 United States Census, San Marino had a median household income of $131,758, with 5.4% of the population living below the federal poverty line.

2000
As of the census of 2000, there were 12,945 people, 4,266 households, and 3,673 families residing in the city. The racial makeup of the city was 51.98% White, 0.15% African American, 0.05% Native American, 47.7% Asian, 0.08% Pacific Islander, 1.04% from other races, and 2.30% from two or more races. Hispanic or Latino of any race were 3.25% of the population. More than one-third of the city's population, 33.3%, was Chinese.

There were 4,266 households, out of which 42% had children under the age of 18 living with them, 75% were married couples living together, 8.6% had a female householder with no husband present, and 13.9% were non-families. Of all households 12% were made up of individuals, and 7.3% had someone living alone who was 65 years of age or older. The average household size was 3.03 and the average family size was 3.29.

In the city, the age distribution of the population showed 26.5% under the age of 18, 6.4% from 18 to 24, 21.5% from 25 to 44, 29.4% from 45 to 64, and 16.2% who were 65 years of age or older.  The median age was 43 years (this was older than average age in the U.S.). For every 100 females, there were 93.1 males.  For every 100 females age 18 and over, there were 89.1 males.

The median income for a household in the city was $147,267, and the median income for a family was $155,708. Males had a median income of $98,928 versus $51,853 for females. The per capita income for the city was $59,150.  About 3.7% of families and 5.0% of the population were below the poverty line, including 4.8% of those under age 18 and 3.0% of those age 65 or over. The vast majority, 69.7% of persons, had a Bachelor's degree or higher, compared to 27.2% at the national average.

San Marino is one of the county's cities with the highest proportion of residents of Asian ancestry.

Arts and culture

Notable sites

San Marino is the location of the Huntington Library, Art Museum, and Botanical Gardens. In 1919, Henry E. Huntington provided limited access to his art collection, library containing the rare books and historical documents, and botanical collection. The Huntington's library contains 8 million manuscripts, 440,000 rare books, 454,000 reference books, 900,000 prints and ephemera, 777,000 photographs, and 300,000 digital files. The Huntington's art collections are housed in his large Neoclassical–Palladian mansion and feature European and American art spanning more than 500 years. In addition, the surrounding botanical gardens span approximately 120 acres and contain more than a dozen themed gardens. Collectively, the institution is known as "The Huntington Library, Art Collections and Botanical Gardens", or as "The Huntington," to the public.

El Molino Viejo ("The Old Mill"), completed about 1816 as a grist mill for Mission San Gabriel Arcángel, is in San Marino. It is the oldest commercial building in Southern California. The town is located on the former lands of the historic Rancho Huerta de Cuati.

The Edwin Hubble House: From 1925 to 1953, this two-story stucco home was the residence of one of America's greatest 20th-century astronomers, Edwin Hubble, who, among other accomplishments, discovered extragalactic nebulae and their separation from each other. It is a National Historic Landmark.

The Michael White Adobe House is located on the campus of San Marino High School and houses the San Marino Historical Society archives.

The University of Southern California owns a house in San Marino which is used as the residence of the President of the university. The residence and grounds are often used for University Presidential events.

Across from City Hall, at the northeast corner of Huntington Drive and San Marino Avenue, is the Centennial Clock, donated to the community in 2005 by the Rotary Club of San Marino in celebration of Rotary International's 100th anniversary. Dedicated on July 4, 2005, the nineteen foot high clock includes a time capsule with artifacts donated by residents and community organizations which is to be opened on July 4, 2039, to mark the 100th anniversary of the Rotary Club of San Marino.

In the middle of San Marino lies Lacy Park, a  expanse of grass and trees. Originally named Wilson Lake in 1875, the land was purchased by the city in 1925 and dedicated as a park. It is one of the few neighborhood parks that charge for admission, with a $5 fee for non-San Marino residents on weekends. A picnic area is often the site of musical concerts, civic events and pancake breakfasts. Dogs are welcome with their owners, providing they are on a leash. In recent years, proposals from SMHS alumni Brent and Derek Barker to build a dedicated dog park on the unlandscaped western edge of the park have been shelved due to strident opposition from some of the city's elderly residents. The park includes six championship tennis courts and a pro shop, administered by the San Marino Tennis Foundation. At the west entrance of the park is the Rose Arbor, which is of special significance for the people of San Marino. It is sixty years old and has long been a source of beauty and tranquility to many residents. In recent years the care and upkeep of the Rose Arbor itself has been augmented by private donations from residents who have chosen to sponsor individual posts. The park recently built a memorial to General George S. Patton (a native of San Marino) and also a large memorial to the Armed Forces along with a statue of a sad soldier. The memorial includes the names of all military personnel from San Marino.

The city's local newspaper office is located near the city's most prominent street, Huntington Drive. "The San Marino Tribune" has been the official newspaper of the city since 1929. There are two sections of the weekly paper, an "A" section and a "B" section, the distinction being that it covers not only San Marino news but also the Pasadena, San Gabriel, Alhambra, Arcadia and South Pasadena news.

Government

Local government 
Governing the City of San Marino is a city council of five members, elected by the people for a four-year term. Elections are consolidated with the county and are held on the first Tuesday, following the first Monday in November of odd numbered years.  Terms are staggered so that three seats are available during one election cycle and two seats are available during the next cycle. In 2015, the state enacted a law to require municipalities to consolidate their elections beginning January 1, 2018. The five council members serve without any financial compensation and elect one of their own members as Mayor.

The current city council members are: 
 Mayor: Steve Talt (2022) 
 Vice Mayor: Dr. Steven W. Huang (2022)
 Council members: Gretchen Shepherd Romey, Calvin Lo, Tony Chou (2022)

San Marino's Fiscal Year 2019-2020 operating budget is $25,807,192. The city manager reports that for FY 2019-2020 "personnel costs comprise 2/3rds of the operating budget, and the largest portion of the increase from FY 2018-2019 is in that area."

The San Marino City Council page states:
 "San Marino was formed to protect your personal rights and to control the growth and activities of the City in such a way that each individual resident will be guaranteed a pleasant place in which to live with a minimum of nuisance, with assurance that his property values will be protected by stringent zoning regulations. It is your City Council's desire to acquaint the old and new residents with the history and background of San Marino, its many advantages and some of your responsibilities as a citizen."

List of mayors 
This is a list of San Marino mayors by year.
 1913-1922 George S. Patton
 1922 William L. Valentine
 1922-1924 George S. Patton
 1980-1984 Lynn P. Reitnouer 
 1990 Suzanne Crowell 
 2001 Matthew Lin - First Chinese-American mayor in San Marino.
 2009 Eugene Sun
 2012 Richard Sun 
 2013 Richard Ward 
 2015 Eugene Sun 
 2016 Allan Yung 
 2017 Richard Sun 
 2018 Steve Talt 
 2019 Steven Huang 
 2020 Gretchen Shepherd Romey 
2021 Ken Ude 
 2022 Steve Talt

State and federal representation 
In the House of Representatives, San Marino is located in California's 27th congressional district, represented by Democrat Judy Chu.

Education
On September 9, 1913, the first San Marino school was opened at the corner of Monterey Road, then called Calle de Lopez, and Oak Knoll, in what was known as the Old Mayberry Home. There were three teachers and thirty-five pupils from kindergarten through the eighth grade; high school students attended South Pasadena High School until San Marino High School was founded in 1952. San Marino High School graduated its first class in 1956. The high school's mascot, "The Titans", comes from Mt. Titano, in the Republic of San Marino.

San Marino High School is situated on the former site of Carver Elementary School. In 1996, the high school reconstruction was begun and the school is now equipped with new laboratories, classrooms, and Ethernet connections, supported mainly by bond issues and rigorous fund-raising by the San Marino Schools Endowment. The new buildings include a brand new cafeteria, orchestra and band room, dance studio, journalism lab, and renovated auditoriums, as well as a renovated baseball field and a brand new football field/track. The School Board's budget totals around $3 million in a given year.

San Marino High School is part of the San Marino Unified School District. Its public funding is supplemented by private donations raised through the San Marino Schools Foundation. Each year, the Foundation raises funds necessary to balance the District's budget. To date, the San Marino Schools Foundation has contributed $18,268,485 to the schools since its inception in March 1980.  Between 2013 and 2017, the district was noted for having the highest percentage of students who met and exceeded the California Assessment of Student Performance and Progress standards.

The San Marino Unified School District has been ranked as the top unified school district in the state of California for eighteen consecutive years, including 2018. Each of its public primary schools has also been honored as a California Distinguished School and a National Blue Ribbon School.

There are four public schools in San Marino Unified School District:
Valentine Elementary School
Carver Elementary School
Huntington Middle School
San Marino High School

The two elementary schools offer instruction for grades K-5, the middle school for grades 6-8, and the high school for grades 9-12. The middle school was named Henry E. Huntington School, after San Marino's "first citizen." In 1953, a new K. L. Carver Elementary was completed at its current location on San Gabriel Boulevard and was named after K. L. Carver, a long-serving school board member.
Stoneman Elementary School, named for Governor George Stoneman, who had resided in San Marino, is no longer used for instruction by San Marino School District. The former school is now leased by the San Marino City Recreation Department and houses San Marino Unified School District special education staff.

In November 2007, San Marino High School was ranked 82nd on a list of the best high schools in the nation, according to U.S. News & World Report.

Private schools

Southwestern Academy, a private college preparatory school, was founded on April 7, 1924. The campus was part of an original Spanish grant (the old ranch grew orange and avocado trees) and the land was subsequently legalized by Abraham Lincoln. "Southwestern Academy" was named to capture the distinctive spirit of the Southwestern United States. Pioneer Hall, which was Southwestern's original campus building, was the home of then-Governor George Stoneman.
Saints Felicitas and Perpetua school is a Catholic school that offers education in grades K-8. The city took the Archdiocese of Los Angeles to the Supreme Court to block the construction of the school, as it was attempting to demolish a historical site called Casa Blanca or the Old Adobe (at one time the Luther Harvey Titus Adobe) to make way for the new school. Saints Felicitas & Perpetua School was completed and dedicated in 1950.

Media

Newspapers
The city is served by the San Marino Tribune, a paid community weekly newspaper and the San Marino Outlook, also a community weekly newspaper.

Infrastructure
The city is currently served by the San Marino Police Department.

The Crowell Public Library opened in 2008.

Notable people
										
Lee Baca, former Sheriff of Los Angeles County
Andrew D. Bernstein, Senior Director, NBA Photos
John Bryson, President of Edison International and former United States Secretary of Commerce
Henry Bumstead, production designer, winner of two Academy Awards : To Kill a Mockingbird
Drucilla Cornell, author, chairman in jurisprudence at the University of Cape Town; S.M.H.S. graduate
Christine Craft, attorney, KGO radio personality and former television news anchor.
Mark Cronin, television producer
Peter B. Dervan, awarded the National Medal of Science in Chemistry, professor at Caltech
Darren Dreifort, former MLB pitcher: Los Angeles Dodgers
Christian Gerhartsreiter, serial imposter and convicted murderer, lived here using the pseudonym "Christopher Chichester"
James G. Ellis, Dean of the Marshall School of Business at USC
Jim Gott, former MLB pitcher: Los Angeles Dodgers, Pittsburgh Pirates, San Francisco Giants
Pat Haden, Athletic Director of USC and former Pro quarterback for the Los Angeles Rams.
John Hart, actor, the Masked Man in The Lone Ranger from 1952 to 1954
Stephen Hillenburg, animator, writer and television producer, creator of SpongeBob SquarePants
Edwin Hubble, astronomer, changed view of universe per galaxy redshift leading to Big Bang cosmology
Henry E. Huntington, railroad executive, founder of The Huntington Library
Jaime Jarrín, Spanish-language broadcaster: Los Angeles Dodgers, sportscaster award  Baseball Hall of Fame
Jane Kaczmarek, actress, Saturday Night Live, Pleasantville, Malcolm in the Middle
Howard Kazanjian, film producer:  Raiders of the Lost Ark, Return of the Jedi; former V.P. at Lucasfilm
Herman Leonard, jazz photographer, photo collection is in the permanent archives in the Smithsonian Museum in Washington, D.C.
Thomas Mack, former right guard, NFL, Los Angeles Rams
Elliot Meyerowitz, chairman, Division of Biology at the California Institute of Technology
Robert A. Millikan, experimental physicist, awarded the 1923 Nobel Prize in Physics for the electron charge
Adolfo Müller-Ury, Swiss-born American painter,  noted for portraits of Popes and Presidents
Charles A. Nichols, Animation Director, Hannah-Barbara, Walt Disney 
C. L. Max Nikias, president of the University of Southern California
Nancy O'Dell, television personality,  Access Hollywood
Merlin Olsen (1940-2010), former defensive lineman, NFL, Los Angeles Rams, actor (Little House on the Prairie), sportscaster NBC.
Stephan Pastis, comic artist, Pearls Before Swine
George S. Patton Sr. (1856-1927), attorney, first mayor of San Marino, California (1913-1922)
George S. Patton Jr. (1885-1945), Army General, World War II
Michael W. Perry, former chairman and CEO of IndyMac Bank, now OneWest Bank
Steven B. Sample, former President of the University of Southern California
Rob Schneider, actor, comedian. Saturday Night Live, Deuce Bigalow: Male Gigolo, The Hot Chick and Grown Ups.
Donald Segretti, political operative, involved in Watergate
Tim Sloan, ex-CEO of Wells Fargo
Joachim Splichal, Chef and founder of the Patina Restaurant Group
George Stoneman, 15th Governor of California, Civil War Union Army General
Bradley Whitford, actor, The West Wing, Studio 60 on the Sunset Strip, Billy Madison
Yanis C. Yortsos, Dean of the Viterbi School of Engineering at USC
Joseph Wambaugh, novelist, including  The New Centurions, and nonfiction The Onion Field
Ahmed H. Zewail, awarded the Nobel Prize in Chemistry, femtochemistry, Caltech Chair of Chemistry

In popular culture

Movies
Father of the Bride, The Wedding Singer, In Name Only, and The Holiday were filmed in San Marino.

Television
Many TV shows, like Alias, The Office, Parks and Recreation, The West Wing, Felicity, and The Good Place, have been filmed on location in San Marino.

See also
 California's 25th State Senate district
 History of the Chinese Americans in Los Angeles
 Governor Stoneman Adobe, Los Robles California Historical Landmark
 El Molino Viejo California Historical Landmark

References

 James T. Maher, 1975. The Twilight of Splendor: Chronicles of the Age of American Palaces. - A chapter is on Huntington's San Marino estate.

External links

 
1913 establishments in California
Cities in Los Angeles County, California
Communities in the San Gabriel Valley
Incorporated cities and towns in California
Populated places established in 1913
San Rafael Hills